Nemophora bellela is a moth of the Adelidae family. It is the only circumpolar species of the Nemophora, and the only representative of the genus in North America, where it is found from Quebec across Canada north of the plains to the mountains of British Columbia and Alaska.

In Europe, it is found in Fennoscandia, Lithuania and northern Russia.

Adults are on wing in June and July in northern Europe.

The larvae feed on Betula nana and Salix species.

References

External links
lepiforum.de
Nemophora bellela on Bug Guide

Moths described in 1863
Moths of Europe
Adelidae